The Western Australian Cricket Association (known as the WACA) is the governing body for cricket in Western Australia.

The WACA was formed on 5 November 1885. In 1893, the association opened the WACA Ground.

Elite cricket
The WACA is responsible for managing Western Australia's first-class cricket male team in the Sheffield Shield and Marsh Cup and female team in the Women's National Cricket League (WNCL).

In the Big Bash League and Women's Big Bash League, the WACA is represented by the Perth Scorchers & Perth Scorchers (Women) respectively.

Competitions
The WACA is responsible for administering Western Australian Premier Cricket.

The Association formerly hosted a popular annual cricket festival at Lilac Hill in Guildford between a Chairman's XI and the visiting International XI team. The first match in 1990 drew a crowd of 12,000 to watch the hosts play the England XI. The last of these was held in 2009 due to the difficulty in scheduling matches of this type in international team tours.

The Association
The current Chairman of the WACA is former Sports Minister of Western Australia, The Honourable Terry Waldron.

The current Chief Executive Officer is Christina Matthews.

Current WACA Board
 Chairman - The Honourable Terry Waldron
 Directors Appointed By The Board - Eva Skira AM (Deputy Chair), David Bailey, Kerry Sanderson AC CVO 
 Members Representatives - Michael Veletta, Tom Percy QC, Graeme Wood, Nicola Brandon
 WA District Cricket Council (Inc.) Representative - Christian Bauer
 Statewide Cricket Committee Representative - Avril Fahey

Affiliations
The WACA is affiliated with Cricket Australia.

See also

Cricket in Western Australia

References

External links

Western Australia
Cric
 
1885 establishments in Australia
Sports organizations established in 1885